The men's coxless four rowing event at the 2011 Pan American Games will be held from October 15–17 at the Canoe & Rowing Course in Ciudad Guzman. The defending Pan American Games champion is Horacio Sicilia, Maximiliano Martínez, Joaquín Iwan and Diego López of Argentina.

Schedule
All times are Central Standard Time (UTC-6).

Results

Heat 1

Heat 2

Repechage

Final B

Final A

References

Rowing at the 2011 Pan American Games